Carol Mujokoro (born Carol Chivengwa) is a Zimbabwean Christian/gospel music artist and pastor.

Biography
Carol Mujokoro is a Zimbabwean Christian Musician, Songwriter, Composer as well as a Pastor.

She started her professional music career in the early 1990s then later enrolled for a Diploma in Biblical Stidies & Christian Leadership with the Africa Multination for Christ College (AMFCC) from 2008-2010.
  
After obtaining a diploma from AMFCC, she went on to enrol for a degree in Biblical Studies with Friends University and later on a Master's Degree and a Doctorate from Triune University.

Discography

Albums
1993: Mufudzi Wangu
1994: Ndinokudai Jesu
1995: Vimba NaJehovah
1996: Kutenda
1996: Ropa RaJesu
1999: NdiMwari Baba
2001: Jehovah Wakanaka2003: Ngatimunamate2004: Mufudzi Wakanaka2006: Nditungamirei2007: Kunamata Kungwara2011: Champions2017: X-Trim Worship 12020: X-Trim Worship 2Videography
2003: In the Holy Land2006: Nditungamirei2017: X-Trim Worship 12020: X-Trim Worship 2Tours
Mujokoro has toured major towns of Zimbabwe performing at musical concerts as well as church crusades. She has also toured most of the SADC countries as a Musician.

In 2003, she toured The Holy Land, Israel specifically to see the land where Jesus Christ lived and to record a music video for the album Ngatimunamate. She became the first Zimbabwean gospel artist to achieve that feat.

Awards
2000: TSAMA (Tinotenda Siyabonga Annual Music Awards) Best Female Artist.
2012: ZimPraise Legendary Award for her contribution in shaping the Zimbabwe Gospel Music genre.
2014: PERMICAN award from ChristTV
2016: PERMICAN Legendary Award

Qualifications
Doctor of Phylosophy in Theology  - Triune Biblical University
Master of Theology - Triune Biblical University
Bachelor of Biblical Studies - Friends International Christian University
Diploma in Biblical Stidies & Christian Leadership - Africa Multination For Christ College
Palliative Care Training  -  Island Hospice
Executive Secretarial Studies   - PITMANS

 References 

Diva-Portal article

 Chitando, Ezra Singing culture ; A Study of Gospel Music in Zimbabwe''

External links 
 

Year of birth missing (living people)
Living people
Zimbabwean gospel singers